Virgibacillus chiguensis is a bacterium. It is Gram-positive, rod-shaped, motile, endospore-forming and halophilic, with NTU-101T (=BCRC 17637T =CGMCC 1.6496T) as the type strain.

References

Further reading
Da Silva, Neusely, et al. Microbiological Examination Methods of Food and Water: A Laboratory Manual. CRC Press, 2012.
Staley, James T., et al. "Bergey's manual of systematic bacteriology, vol. 3."Williams and Wilkins, Baltimore, MD (1989): 2250–2251.

External links

LPSN
Type strain of Virgibacillus chiguensis at BacDive -  the Bacterial Diversity Metadatabase

Bacillaceae
Bacteria described in 2008